Avenida Horta e Costa is a major thoroughfare in Macau, China.

Naming 
The road was named after José Maria de Sousa Horta e Costa, twice appointed governor of Macau.

Famous buildings 
The Red Market of Macau is located at one end of the road, as is the Music Conservatory of Macau.

See also
 List of roads in Macau

External links 
 Avenida Horta e Costa at MacauTourism.gov.mo

Roads in Macau